"Kommotion" is a song written by Duane Eddy and Lee Hazlewood and performed by Eddy. The song reached #13 on the UK Singles Chart and #78 on the Billboard Hot 100 in 1960. The song appeared on his 1960 album, $1,000,000.00 Worth of Twang.

The song was produced by Lee Hazlewood and Lester Sill.

References

1960 songs
1960 singles
Songs written by Duane Eddy
Songs written by Lee Hazlewood
Duane Eddy songs
Song recordings produced by Lee Hazlewood
Song recordings produced by Lester Sill
Jamie Records singles